The Pennsylvania Derby is a race for thoroughbred horses run at Parx Racing and Casino (formerly known as Keystone Race Track, then from 1986 through 2010 as Philadelphia Park) each year.

In 2016, the purse was increased to $1.25 million because of the presence of the winners of two of the three Triple Crown races: Nyquist, winner of the 2016 Kentucky Derby, and Exaggerator, winner of the 2016 Preakness Stakes. If Creator, winner of the 2016 Belmont, had also raced, the purse would have been $1.5 million.

The Pennsylvania Derby began on Memorial Day in 1979 and achieved Graded status in 1981. From 1990 until 2009, with the exception of 2006 due to extensive renovations, the race was held on Labor Day; in 2004, it was elevated to a Grade II event. Starting in 2010, the race moved to the last Saturday of September in an attempt to get a stronger field preparing for the Breeders' Cup; the move to late September also made it possible to move away from another premier event, the Travers Stakes at Saratoga Race Course in New York State. In 2017 it was raised to Grade I status for the first time.

In 1991, Andrea Seefeldt became the first female jockey to win the Pennsylvania Derby and the following year Pam Shavelson became the first female trainer to win the race. There was no running of the Pennsylvania Derby in 2020.

Records
Time record: 
 1:46:96 – Bayern (2014)

Largest winning margin:
 Western Playboy – 17 lengths.

Most wins by a jockey:
 3 – Joe Bravo (1994, 2003, 2008)
 3 – Mike Smith (2017, 2018, 2022)

Most wins by a trainer:
 4 – Bob Baffert (2014, 2017, 2018, 2022)

Most wins by an owner:
 2 – Ryehill Farm (1979, 1988)
 2 – Robert E. Meyerhoff (1986, 1991)
 2 – Dogwood Stable (1990, 1993)

Winners

References

 The Pennsylvania Derby at Pedigeree Query

Graded stakes races in the United States
Flat horse races for three-year-olds
Horse races in Pennsylvania
Recurring sporting events established in 1979
Parx Casino and Racing
1979 establishments in Pennsylvania